Ashford is a small village situated in the north-west on the Northern Tablelands of the state of New South Wales. The New England rural village of Ashford lies within the broad sunlit lands 748 km north of Sydney, 500 km south west of Brisbane, close to the Queensland border. Ashford is 430 metres above sea level and located 56 km north of Inverell on a major arterial road, connecting the Gwydir and Bruxner highways through to the Queensland border.

History

"Frazer's Creek" Post Office was established in 1853 and renamed Ashford in 1863. The first police station was opened in 1864 and the first school in 1868.

Fred Ward a bushranger, known as "Captain Thunderbolt" rode in the area in 1867. Primary industries in the town over the years included tobacco farming and a local coal mine though each of these have ceased.

Today, the surrounding areas are used for sheep and cattle farming.

Today
Ashford is a small community with a K-12 public school, basic shops, churches, and recreation and entertainment facilities, including a swimming pool, golf course and bowling club. Ashford Roosters play in the Group 19 Rugby League competition. It is the hub of a large agricultural area, an active retirement community, and regional tourism.  Local attractions include Pindari Dam on the Severn River, MacIntyre Falls, the annual Ashford Salami Festival and Ashford Caves at Kwiambal National Park.

References

https://web.archive.org/web/20140204195901/http://www.ashfordnsw.com.au/the-town/

External links

 https://web.archive.org/web/20071026151924/http://www.ashfordonline.com.au/%2A www.ashfordnsw.com.au

Towns in New South Wales
Towns in New England (New South Wales)
Inverell Shire